Kaadan in Tamil, Aranya in Telugu, and Haathi Mere Saathi in Hindi, is a 2021 Indian action adventure film written and directed by Prabhu Solomon. Produced by Eros International, the film stars Rana Daggubati, Vishnu Vishal (Tamil and Telugu), Pulkit Samrat (Hindi), Shriya Pilgaonkar, and Zoya Hussain. It was filmed simultaneously in Tamil, Telugu, and Hindi languages, each with slightly different cast members.

Kaadan and Aranya were released on 26 March 2021, delayed from the initial release of 2 April 2020 due to the COVID-19 pandemic. The theatrical release of Haathi Mere Saathi was put on hold which subsequently opted for a direct-to-video release on Zee Cinema and Eros Now on 18 September 2021. The film was promoted as a comic strip by famous children's magazine, Tinkle as Little Bandev.

Plot

Kaadan (Tamil)/Aranya (Telugu)/Bandev (Hindi) is a true-blue animal film signifying a deep and strong bond between humans and animals.

Cast

Production 
The film was announced on 13 December 2017. Prabhu Solomon wanted to bring the issue of elephant abuse to the light. Unnikrishnan, an elephant who played a role in Kumki 2, also plays a pivotal role in the film. Hindi actress Zoya Hussain was signed to play a role. Rana Daggubati shed 15 kilograms for this film by eating vegetarian food for six weeks. The makers initially announced Kalki Koechlin to play a role in the film, however, she was replaced by Shriya Pilgaonkar. Vishnu Vishal was signed to play a role in the Tamil and Telugu versions while Pulkit Samrat will reprise his role in the Hindi version.

Release 

Initially scheduled for release on 2 April 2020, the film release was then indefinitely postponed due to the COVID-19 pandemic, before being rescheduled to be released on 15 January 2021 to coincide with Pongal festival. In January 2021, the film has been announced to release on 26 March 2021.

In March 2021, owing to the COVID-19 situation, the release of Hindi version Haathi Mere Saathi has been postponed. Tamil and Telugu versions, however, are released as scheduled. The Hindi version is set to have a direct-to-video release on the television channel Zee Cinema followed by the streaming platform Eros Now on 18 September 2021. The satellite rights of the film were sold to Zee Tamil for Tamil Version and Telugu version was sold to Zee Telugu

Music 

The music for the film has been composed by Shantanu Moitra and lyrics written by Swanand Kirkire (Hindi version) and Vanamali (Tamil and Telugu versions).

Reception

Aranya 
The Times of India critic Suhas Yelupantla rated the film 3.5 stars of 5 and calling it an "engaging ride." He added that, "The first few minutes of the film are among the best. The visual effects, backed by the background score is spot on. The portrayal of the elephants is even better."

Sangeetha Devi Dundoo of The Hindu felt that the film could have been better, and added "Rana singularly tries to hold things together, trying to save the elephants as well as the film." Hemanth Kumar, in his review for the Firstpost, also echoed the same, stating that: "Rana Daggubati's film on ecosystem conservation, is educational but exceptionally insipid." The Indian Express journalist Manoj Kumar rated the film 2/5 and called it "sub-standard." He added that Aranya was redeemed by its cinematography, Resul Pookutty's sound design, and Daggubati's acting."

Kaadan 
A reviewer from Sify called it a "noble attempt." They termed "Rana and his earnest performance as Kaadan" and "AR Ashok Kumar's splendid cinematography" as the film's main highlights. Haricharan Pudipeddi of Hindustan Times opined that the film was predictable and added: "its grandeur merely used as a gimmick to project the film on epic scale." Pudipeddi appreciated Daggubati's performance, calling it "one of his best till date." M. Sugandh in his The Times of India review wrote: "Prabu Solomon is more interested in telling us a story. It is only in the climax that the filmmaker starts to sermonise, which feels unnecessary given that we get the movie's 'message' even without the need for any underscoring."

Haathi Mere Saathi 
NDTV Saibal Chatarjee rated the film 2/5 and opined that the film rode on Daggubati's shoulders. He added that Solomon delivered the message on increasing deforestation in a gratuitously high-pitched manner, completely devoid of nuance. Writing for the Rediff.com, Sukanya Verma gave a negative review and said: "Between bad writing, hysterical acting and a shoddy blend of CGI and the real deal, Haathi Mere Saathi completely neglects the message of saving our elephants."

References

External links 
 
 
Haathi Mere Saathi on Bollywood Hungama

2020s Hindi-language films
2020s Tamil-language films
2020s Telugu-language films
2021 action adventure films
2021 direct-to-video films
2021 films
Elephants in India
Films about animal rights
Films about elephants
Films directed by Prabhu Solomon
Films not released in theaters due to the COVID-19 pandemic
Films postponed due to the COVID-19 pandemic
Films set in forests
Indian action adventure films
Indian direct-to-video films
Indian multilingual films
2021 multilingual films